In Kidwell v The Master, an important case in the South African law of succession, the testator had signed right at the bottom of the will; there was about  between the end of the will (which included the witnesses’ signatures) and the testator's signature. The question before the court was where the end of the will was. The court held that the will was invalid as it did not comply with section 2(1)(a)(i) of the Wills Act. The decision has been criticised as overly formalistic by some commentators, who believe the overriding criteria for the courts should be to give effect to the wishes of the testator, and this case did not do this over something seemingly insignificant.

See also 
 South African law of succession

Notes 
 Kidwell v The Master 1983 (1) SA 509 (E).

References 

Law of succession in South Africa
South African case law
1983 in case law
1983 in South African law